Woopen Creek is a rural locality in the Cairns Region, Queensland, Australia.

Geography 

The Russell River forms the northern boundary of the locality while mountainous regions form its other boundaries. There are two flatter valleys formed by Woopen Creek in the southern part of locality and Vorris Creek in the northern part of the locality. Although the land is predominantly freehold, only the flatter valleys are developed for use for agriculture while the more mountainous areas remain undeveloped. The principal agricultural use is growing sugarcane and bananas.

Although the Bruce Highway does not pass through the locality, 

Mount Mirinjo in the Francis Range is in the southernmost part of locality, close to the boundary with Ngatjan.

History 
By 1940, residents of Woopen Creek had agitated for some years to have a school in their district. In November 1941 tenders were called to erect the school. However, the school was not built at this time, probably because the fear of a Japanese invasion in 1942 resulted in the closure of schools in coastal areas and reserving all construction materials exclusively for military purposes. In March 1951 residents made another attempt to establish a school at Woopen Creek. In 1951 the Queensland Government decided relocate the school building from Nerada State School (which closed in 1945) to establish Woopen Creek State School. The school opened on 4 February 1952. It closed on 8 December 1967.

In 2005 the Broken Nose Vanilla farm was established, an example of a wider trend of diversifying the agriculture of the Cairns region.

Education 
There are no schools in Woopen Creek. The nearest primary schools are Bartle Frere State School in neighbouring Bartle Frere to the north and Mirriwinni State School in Mirriwinni to the north-east. The nearest secondary school is Babinda State School (Prep-12) in Babinda to the north-east.

References

Further reading 

  — Incorporating Memories of Woopen Creek State School 1952-1967.

External links 

Populated places in Far North Queensland
Suburbs of Cairns
Localities in Queensland